Peter Tkachev may refer to:

 Pyotr Tkachev (1844–1886), Russian writer, critic and revolutionary theorist
 Peter Andreevich Tkachev, Russian weapons engineer